Theerpugal Virkapadum is a 2021 Indian Tamil-language vigilante thriller film directed by Dheran, starring Sathyaraj, Madhusudhan Rao, Smruthi Venkat and Harish Uthaman. The film is completely shot in 8K resolution and has cinematography by Garudavega Anji. It also have a Telugu dubbed version titled as Emergency.

Summary 
Dr. Nalan Kumar, who seems to be in his early 60s, kidnaps the son of an influential businessman Rudhravel and threatens to kill the youngster if he fails to perform certain tasks assigned to him. Later, Rudhravel gets to know who is behind his son's kidnap. He, along with his nephew Rajendran, decides to take on the sexagenarian after realizing why he is after them.

Cast 
 
Sathyaraj as Dr. Nalan Kumar
Madhusudhan Rao as Rudhravel 
Harish Uthaman as Rajendran
Yuvan Mayilswamy as Kishore
Smruthi Venkat as Bharathi
Renuka as Dr. Aruna Stephen Raj		
Charle as Dr. Parthiban
Sriranjini as Kishore's mother
 Yas as Yogeshwaran (Yoga)
George Maryan as Court Attender
Jeeva Ravi as Aruna's husband
Lollu Sabha Manohar as Rudravel's staff
Lizzie Antony as Doctor
Pondy Ravi as Defense Lawyer
Subramani as Public Prosecutor
Gajaraj as DSP Ashok Krishna
Kaalai

Production 
Debutant director Dheran who has directed several advertisements brought in actor Sathyaraj to play the solo lead in Theerpugal Virkapadum, produced by Sajeev Meerasahib Rawther under his banner HoneyBee Creations and later transferred to C R saleem under his banner, AL Tari movies . Dheeran took three years to complete the script before approaching the producer. Actress Smruthi Venkat of Thadam fame was signed to play the daughter character of Sathyaraj with actors Harish Uthaman, Lizzie Antony and Madhusudhan in important roles. Sathyaraj refused to opt for a body double in action sequences as per reports and completed his dubbing in a single stretch of 12 hours. The film was completed in three schedules and was primarily shot in Chennai.

Critical reception
Thinkal Menon gave the film 3 stars, complimenting the writing and several performances but felt the plot was repetitive and predictable.

References

External links 
 

2021 films
2020s Tamil-language films
Films shot in Chennai
2021 directorial debut films
Films postponed due to the COVID-19 pandemic